Giuseppe Meda, originally Giuseppe Lomazzo (c. 1534–1599) was an Italian painter, architect and hydraulics engineer.

Born in Milan, he apprenticed as painter under Bernardino Campi. He also studied as architect and engineer, and planned a never realized though interesting project to make navigable the Adda River from Cornate and Paderno.

As  a painter he was an exponent of the late Lombard Mannerism, with influences by Michelangelo, Leonardo and the Milanese Gaudenzio Ferrari. His works include the frescoes in the Cathedral of Monza, in collaboration with Giuseppe Arcimboldo, and the decoration of the organ in the Duomo of Milan.

As an architect he often completed works begun by Pellegrino Tibaldi, such as the Church of St. Sebastian and Lazzaretto Chapel in Milan. He also provided drawing for the Escorial.  He also started a project for the Trivulzio family chapels at San Stefano in Brolo and the reconstruction of S. Lorenzo.

Further reading
 G. P. Lomazzo, Trattato dell’arte della pittura, Milan (1584), Florence (1974)
 G. P. Lomazzo, Idea del Tempio della pittura, Milan (1590), Florence (1973)
 A. Lamo, Discorso di Alessandro Lamo intorno alla scoltura e pittura, dove ragiona della vita ed opere in molti luoghi ed a diversi principi e personaggi fatte fatte dall’eccellentissimo e nobile M. Bernardino Campo pittore cremonese, Crémone (1584), published in an appendix by G. B. Zaist, Notizie de' pittori scultori ed architetti cremonesi, Crémone (1774) vol. I, Bergame (1976)
 C. Baroni, L’architettura a Milano dal Bramante al Richini, Milan (1941)
 C. Baroni, Appunti d’archivio su Giuseppe Meda, “Rivista d’arte”, S. II, 5 (1933)
 L. Grassi, Meda, Giuseppe, in Province del barocco e del rococò in Lombardia. proposed as a biographical dictionary, Milan (1964)
 C. Baroni, Documenti per la storia dell’architettura a Milano tra Rinascimento e Barocco, II, Rome (1968)
 J. Turnure, The organ shutters of Milan Cathedral, in Il duomo di Milano. Atti del convegno internazionale, I, Milan (1968)
 A. Rovetta, Via Torino. Tempio Civico di S. Sebastiano, in Milano ritrovata: l’asse via Torino, exposition catalog, Milan (1988)
 F. Ricardi, Le ante d’organo del Duomo di Milano, in “Archivio Storico Lombardo” (Lombardic Historic Archives), S. V, CXIV (1988)
 R. S. Miller, Gli affreschi cinquecenteschi: Giuseppe Arcimboldo, Giuseppe Meda e Giovan Battista della Rovere detto il Fiammenghino, in Monza. Il Duomo nella storia e nell’arte, Milan (1989)
 R. S. Miller, Note su Giuseppe Arcimboldo, Giuseppe Meda, Giovan Battista Della Rovere detto il Fiammenghino ed altri pittori milamesi, in Studi monzesi, 5 (1989)
 F. Frangi, Meda, Giuseppe, in Pittura in Brianza e in Valsassina dall’Alto Medioevo al Neoclassicismo, Milan (1993)
 D. Antonini, San Sebastiano: un’architettura di Pellegrino Tibaldi nella Milano borromaica, inAnnali di architettura, 10–11, (1998-1999)
 F. Repishti, Disegni et modelli et parer de Giuseppe Meda, Vincenzo Seregni et Pellegrino Tibaldi for l’Escorial (1572), in Arte lombarda no. 128 (000) 
 L. Giacomini, Tre palazzi privati e l’architetto Pellegrino Pellegrini, with Arte Lombarda, CXXXVII (2003)

External links 

1530s births
1599 deaths
Engineers from Milan
16th-century Italian painters
Italian male painters
Painters from Milan
16th-century Italian architects
Architects from Milan